The Pingstförsamlingarnas teologiska seminarium (English: Pentecostal Theological Seminary of Sweden) was a Pentecostal seminary located in Uppsala serving Pentecostal Christians of Sweden. In 2011 the seminary emerged with other religious organizations to found the new seminary Akademi för Ledarskap och Teologi.

External links
Pingst

Defunct educational institutions in Sweden